In Tandem is a live album by American pianist Kenny Barron and guitarist Ted Dunbar which was recorded in 1975 and first released on the Muse label in 1980.

Reception

In his review on Allmusic, Ken Dryden notes "This duo concert by pianist Kenny Barron and guitarist Ted Dunbar is excerpted from a 1975 concert at Rutgers University, where both of them were teaching at the time. Barron and Dunbar (who made a number of recordings, but very few as a leader or co-leader) mesh very well together ... The duo tracks are long but never run out of gas ... There are also solo features for each man."

Track listing 
 "Summertime" (George Gershwin, Ira Gershwin, DuBose Heyward) – 14:55
 "Here's That Rainy Day' (Jimmy Van Heusen, Johnny Burke) – 10:07
 "Aruba" (Kenny Barron, Ted Dunbar) – 18:10
 "On the Trail" (Ferde Grofé) – 6:50

Personnel 
Kenny Barron – piano (tracks 1–3)
Ted Dunbar – guitar (tracks 1, 3 & 4)

References 

Kenny Barron live albums
Ted Dunbar live albums
1980 live albums
Muse Records live albums
Albums produced by Michael Cuscuna